The CA postcode area, also known as the Carlisle postcode area, is a group of 28 postcode districts in north-west England, within 22 post towns. These cover northern and central Cumbria, including Carlisle, Penrith, Workington, Whitehaven, Maryport, Cockermouth, Egremont, Alston, Appleby-in-Westmorland, Beckermet, Brampton, Cleator, Cleator Moor, Frizington, Holmrook, Keswick, Kirkby Stephen, Moor Row, Ravenglass, Seascale, St Bees and Wigton, plus a very small part of Northumberland.


Coverage
The approximate coverage of the postcode districts:

|-
! CA1
| CARLISLE
| Carlisle (east)
| City of Carlisle
|-
! CA2
| CARLISLE
| Carlisle (south and west)
| City of Carlisle
|-
! CA3
| CARLISLE
| Carlisle (north)
| City of Carlisle
|-
! CA4
| CARLISLE
| Warwick Bridge, Wetheral, Cumwhinton, Armathwaite
| City of Carlisle, Eden
|-
! CA5
| CARLISLE
| Dalston, Burgh by Sands, Thursby
| City of Carlisle, Allerdale
|-
! CA6
| CARLISLE
| Longtown, Penton
| City of Carlisle
|-
! CA7
| WIGTON
| Wigton, Silloth, Aspatria, Caldbeck, Hesket Newmarket
| Allerdale, Eden
|-
! CA8
| BRAMPTON
| Brampton, Gilsland, Greenhead, Lambley, Slaggyford
| City of Carlisle, Northumberland
|-
! CA9
| ALSTON
| Alston, Garrigill, Nenthead, Kirkhaugh
| Eden, Northumberland
|-
! CA10
| PENRITH
| Penrith (Carleton Hall area), Shap, Tebay, Kirkby Thore, Langwathby, Lazonby, Pooley Bridge
| Eden, South Lakeland
|-
! CA11
| PENRITH
| Penrith (most of), Stainton, Mungrisdale, Glenridding, Patterdale
| Eden
|-
! CA12
| KESWICK
| Keswick, Seatoller, Braithwaite, Bassenthwaite, Threlkeld
| Allerdale, Eden
|-
! CA13
| COCKERMOUTH
| Cockermouth, Lorton, Buttermere
| Allerdale
|-
! CA14
| WORKINGTON
| Workington, Distington, Stainburn, Seaton
| Allerdale, Copeland
|-
! CA15
| MARYPORT
| Maryport, Dearham, Flimby, Allonby
| Allerdale
|-
! CA16
| APPLEBY-IN-WESTMORLAND
| Appleby-in-Westmorland
| Eden
|-
! CA17
| KIRKBY STEPHEN
| Kirkby Stephen, Brough, Ravenstonedale
| Eden, South Lakeland
|-
! CA18
| RAVENGLASS
| Ravenglass
| Copeland
|-
! CA19
| HOLMROOK
| Holmrook, Santon Bridge, Eskdale
| Copeland
|-
! CA20
| SEASCALE
| Seascale, Sellafield, Gosforth, Wasdale Head
| Copeland
|-
! CA21
| BECKERMET
| Beckermet
| Copeland
|-
! CA22
| EGREMONT
| Egremont, Thornhill
| Copeland
|-
! CA23
| CLEATOR
| Cleator, Ennerdale Bridge
| Copeland
|-
! CA24
| MOOR ROW
| Moor Row
| Copeland
|-
! CA25
| CLEATOR MOOR
| Cleator Moor
| Copeland
|-
! CA26
| FRIZINGTON
| Frizington, Croasdale
| Copeland
|-
! CA27
| ST. BEES
| St Bees
| Copeland
|-
! CA28
| WHITEHAVEN
| Hensingham, Moresby, Parton, Sandwith, Whitehaven
| Copeland
|-
! style="background:#FFFFFF;"|CA95
| style="background:#FFFFFF;"|WORKINGTON
| style="background:#FFFFFF;"|
| style="background:#FFFFFF;"|non-geographic
|-
! style="background:#FFFFFF;"|CA99
| style="background:#FFFFFF;"|CARLISLE
| style="background:#FFFFFF;"|Jobcentre Plus
| style="background:#FFFFFF;"|non-geographic
|}

Map

See also

List of postcode areas in the United Kingdom
Postcode Address File

References

External links
Royal Mail's Postcode Address File
A quick introduction to Royal Mail's Postcode Address File (PAF)

Carlisle, Cumbria
Postcode areas covering North West England